Bifrenaria steyermarkii is a species of orchid.

steyermarkii